Austrapoda hepatica is a species of moth of the family Limacodidae. It is found in the Russian Far East (south-east Siberia), Japan (Hokkaido, Honshu, Shikoku, Kyushu) and Korea.

The wingspan is 25–30 mm.

References

External links 
 The Barcode of Life Data Systems (BOLD)
 Siberian Zoological Museum

Limacodidae
Moths of Japan
Moths described in 1879
Taxa named by Charles Oberthür
Moths of Asia